Tyson Sbongumenzi Meluleki Dlungwana (born 18 February 1997) is a South African field hockey player. He competed in the 2020 Summer Olympics.

References

External links

1997 births
Living people
2018 Men's Hockey World Cup players
Field hockey players at the 2020 Summer Olympics
Field hockey players at the 2018 Commonwealth Games
South African male field hockey players
Olympic field hockey players of South Africa
Field hockey players at the 2014 Summer Youth Olympics
Male field hockey defenders
University of Johannesburg alumni
21st-century South African people
Alumni of Maritzburg College